Kővágóörs is a village in Veszprém county, Hungary. It is one of the largest settlements in the Káli basin. It has 914 inhabitants (2001).

History 
Kővágóörs is landscape protection area, built on a unique geological formation, the fossil sand hill of the Pannon-age Sea.

Stone was quarried throughout centuries here. Excellent millstones (raw material of bastions and buildings) could be prepared from this kind of stone, thus the first part of the name of the village - "stone cutting" ("kővágó").
Today people call this phenomenon of nature the “sea of stones”.

The second part of the town's name originates from the Örs clan. This area was the clan's principal territory at the time of Árpád’s conquest of Hungary, accordingly Kővágóörs was seat of “alispán” or “ispán” (comes).

Three surrounding medieval villages (Ecser, Sóstókál, and Kisörs) were destroyed at the time of the fall of the Ottoman Empire, and the ruins of their respective churches can be seen nearby.

The poet Mihály Barla lived here.

Sights 
 The village has two churches: the older one nowadays used by Lutheran people was built in 1264 and was renovated in Baroque style in the 18th century; the Baroque Catholic church built in front of the Lutheran one was consecrated in 1802.
 The “sea of stones” (read more about it in the history of Kővágóörs)
 Museum of Bajcsy-Zsilinszky Endre

People 
 Mihály Barla
 Rudolf Czipott, lived here
 Samuel Gold,  a Jewish chess player, born here

Sources 
 Somogyi Győző - Szelényi Károly „The Kál Basin by Lake Balaton” 1992

External links
 Hungarian Wikipedia article
 Street map (Hungarian)

References 

Populated places in Veszprém County